Christine Jacoba Aaftink (born 25 August 1966) is a Dutch former speed skater. She made her international debut in 1988 and was the best Dutch sprinter in the first half of the 1990s. She specialized in the 500 m and 1000 m distances, in which she competed at the 1988, 1992 and 1994 Winter Olympics. Her best achievements were fifth and fourth place in 1992 in 500 m and 1000 m, respectively. In 1994 she was the Olympic flag bearer for the Netherlands. She won two bronze medals at the World Sprint Speed Skating Championships for Women in 1990 and 1991.

Nationally, she won at least one sprint title every year between 1987 and 1996. She won all three (500 m, 1000 m and allround sprint) in 1990 and 1992–1994.

Personal bests: 
500 m – 39.88 (1996)
1000 m – 1:20.21 (1996)
1500 m – 2:11.57 (1994)
 3000 m – 5:04.33 (1987)
All records:

 8th place in the World Sprint Championships (1988)
 12th place in the Olympic Games in Calgary (1989)
 5th place in the World Sprint Championships in Netherlands (1990)
 3rd place in the World Sprints (1990)
 3rd place in the tournament in Inzell (1991)
 5th position in the 500 and a 4th in the 1,000 in the Olympics in Albertville (1992)
 19th and 20th at a World Sprints podium (1993)
 5th place in the 1,000 m of the inaugural World Single Distance Championships (1996)
 Won seven consecutive 500 metre titles (1990-96)
 Won Five 1,000 metre titles (1990-94)
 Won the Dutch sprinting title seven times (1987-1990 and 1992-1994)
 Won one World Cup race, over 500 metres

References

1966 births
Dutch female speed skaters
Living people
Olympic speed skaters of the Netherlands
People from Abcoude
Speed skaters at the 1988 Winter Olympics
Speed skaters at the 1992 Winter Olympics
Speed skaters at the 1994 Winter Olympics
21st-century Dutch women
20th-century Dutch women
20th-century Dutch people
Sportspeople from Utrecht (province)